Canterbury is an eastern suburb of Melbourne, Victoria, Australia, 10 km from Melbourne's Central Business District, located within the City of Boroondara local government area. Canterbury recorded a population of 7,800 at the 2021 census.

Famed for its leafy green boulevards and substantial, opulent historic residences, Canterbury is one of Melbourne's most expensive and exclusive suburbs.

Geography
Canterbury extends as far as Mont Albert Road in the north, Burke Road in the west, Chatham and Highfield Roads in the east and Riversdale Road to the south. The main thoroughfare through Canterbury is Canterbury Road, which runs east–west and roughly bisects the suburb.

Canterbury is the home to many of Victoria's oldest and most prestigious private schools, including Camberwell Grammar School, Camberwell Girls Grammar School and Strathcona Baptist Girls Grammar School. Other schools include Camberwell High School, Canterbury Girls' Secondary College and Canterbury Primary School. Canterbury contains various parks and gardens and is home to the Camberwell Hockey Club in Matlock Street. The Canterbury Sports Ground, home of cricket and Australian football, is in Chatham Road.

The main shopping area in Canterbury is around the railway station and includes shops in Canterbury Road, as well as Maling Road. Larger shopping centres nearby include Burke Road in Camberwell and Whitehorse Road in Balwyn.

Canterbury is serviced by the Canterbury and East Camberwell stations, on the Lilydale and Belgrave train lines. It is also serviced by tram routes 72 and 109.

History
The railway station is in many ways responsible for the suburb's existence: before the opening of the railway to the City in 1882, the area was a semi-rural area. Even then, it was occupied by the well to do. Many of these early residents and in some cases, their properties, are remembered in the street names of the suburb, notably Logan Street and Monomeath Avenue.

Canterbury Post Office opened on 22 November 1870 (it was closed between 1887 and 1892). It has since been turned into a café.

The first subdivision in the area came in 1885, when Michael Logan created the 'Claremont Park Estate' within the area of Canterbury Road, Bryson Street, Prospect Hill Road and Logan Street.

At around this time, Edward Snowden settled on 7 hectares in the area centred on a manor he named Monomeath. In 1900 Snowden's estate was subdivided and sold off to form what is now Monomeath Avenue and residents such as notable architect Percey Kernot and prominent citizen George Coghill moved in. The road was paved in 1911 and lined with oak trees. Over time it has gained much cachet in Australian society, famed for its wealthy and sometimes eccentric residents.

Population
In the 2016 Census, there were 8,056 people in Canterbury. 67.2% of people were born in Australia. The next most common countries of birth were China 7.9%, England 3.7%, Malaysia 1.7%, New Zealand 1.6% and India 1.3%. 73.4% of people spoke only English at home. Other languages spoken at home included Mandarin 9.9%, Cantonese 2.4% and Italian 1.3%. The most common responses for religion were No Religion 37.7%, Catholic 20.1% and Anglican 12.8%.

Culture

Canterbury is regarded as one of Melbourne's most exclusive suburbs, particularly the "Golden Mile" – a term referring to a part of Mont Albert Road, running west from Balwyn Road and the avenues that connect it to Canterbury Road, specifically Monomeath Avenue, which is lined by large, century old oak trees and grand ornate mansions and is home to many notable politicians and leaders of business and industry.

Other blue-chip locales along this stretch include Alexandra Avenue, Hopetoun Avenue, Victoria Avenue and The Ridge. It consistently ranks in the top three suburbs for average house prices in Melbourne.

Notable residents
Present and past residents of Canterbury include or have included:
 Sir Macfarlane Burnet virologist best known for his contributions to immunology. He won a Nobel Prize in 1960 for predicting acquired immune tolerance and was best known for developing the theory of clonal selection. He was the first ever Australian of the Year and the Burnet Institute is named in his honour
 Frank Cheshire, bookseller and publisher who founded the F. W. Cheshire Pty. Ltd. publishing house
 Frank Cicuttoformer CEO of National Australia Bank
 Sir Rupert Hamerformer Premier of Victoria
 Billy Harvey , Australian Rules footballer who during World War I won the Military Cross and was killed during the Battle of Passchendaele
 Kylie and Dannii Minogue's family
 Andrew Peacockformer federal leader of the Liberal Party of Australia
 Tom Schiefferformer US Ambassador to Australia, and to Japan

Sport
The suburb has an Australian rules football team called the Canterbury Cobras, who compete in the Yarra Junior Football League.

Schools

Canterbury has a number of primary and secondary schools in its vicinity. These include Canterbury Primary School, Camberwell Grammar School, Camberwell High School, Strathcona Baptist Girls' Grammar School, and Canterbury Girls' Secondary College.

Places of worship
 Canterbury Christadelphians
 Canterbury Presbyterian Church
 Canterbury Baptist Church

See also
 City of Camberwell – Canterbury was previously within this former local government area.

References

External links
 Australian Places – Canterbury

Suburbs of Melbourne
Suburbs of the City of Boroondara